Birzhevyie Vedomosti was a Russian political, economical and literary newspaper, published in Saint Petersburg in 1861—1879. It was based in the Suneyeva House, at Konnogvardeyski Boulevard, 11. 

It was founded by the businessman, financier and journalist Konstantin Trubnikov after the merger of two minor publications, Commerce Gazette and Auctioneers' Journal. He was also its original publisher and editor-in-chief. In 1862 Birzheviye Vedomosti became the official organ of the tax-collecting department of the Imperial Russian government. In 1864 it started to come out six times a week. It had one popular supplement, Vechernyaya Gazeta (The Evening Gazette) (1865-1878) and numerous literary and scientific ones. 

In March 1874 the businessman Vasily Poletika became the co-owner and co-editor of the newspaper, which was also joined in October of that year by Evgeny Karnovich, its new editor-in-chief. In 1875 Poletika acquired all the publishing rights and Birzheiye Vedomosti made a quick transition into an organ of the left opposition. Among its active contributors were brothers Nikolai and Vasily Kurochkins, Nikolai Mikhaylovsky, Alexey Pleshcheyev, Alexander Skabichevsky. It received several warnings from the authorities and was temporarily suspended twice. In 1879 it changed its title into Molva (Rumour) but was closed in 1880.

In 1880, also in  St Petersburg and again by way of merging two pre-existent publications, Birzhevy Vestnik and Russkiy Mir, another newspaper by the same name was founded by Stanislav Propper, then an Austrian citizen, who allegedly bought the rights at an auction, for 13 rubles he had borrowed from friends. Often referred to as Birzhevye Vedomosti's "Second edition", it became a daily in 1885 and was edited first by Propper, later by Vladimir Bondi and Ieronim Yasinsky. A centrist, mildly liberal publication, it lasted until 1917 and was shut down by the city's Bolshevik authorities, answering the standard allegation of being engaged in "anti-Soviet propaganda".

External links 
"Birzhevyie Vedomosti" digital archives in "Newspapers on the web and beyond", the digital resource of the National Library of Russia

References 

Newspapers published in the Russian Empire
Newspapers published in Russia
Newspapers established in 1861
Russian-language newspapers
1861 establishments in the Russian Empire